Arsi Province (Amharic: አርሲ) was a province of Ethiopian Empire with its capital at Asella. Historically a part of the Emirate of Harar until its invasion by Menelik and subsequent incorporation into modern Ethiopia. The province was reduced to a Zone of the Oromia Region with the adoption of the new constitution in 1995. In more ancient times, the region is seemingly related to the Harla.

Both the Zone and the former province are occupied by the Arsi Oromo, who inhabit both the former Bale and Arsi provinces.

History

Aanolee massacre 

In Hitosa, the Aanolee massacre took place on 6 September 1886, in which Emperor Menelik II's army massacred 11,000 Arsi Oromo in one day, cutting women's breasts and men's hands.
In 2014, a monument was erected to remember the victims.

See also
 History of Ethiopia

References

Provinces of Ethiopia
Oromia Region
States and territories established in 1942
States and territories disestablished in 1995